Phragmacossia territa is a species of moth of the family Cossidae. It is found in Lebanon, Syria, Israel, Jordan, Egypt, Iran, Turkey, Turkmenistan, Uzbekistan, Tajikistan and Kyrgyzstan.

Adults have been recorded on wing in August and December in Israel.

References

Moths described in 1878
Zeuzerinae